K. B. Prasanna Kumar is a politician from Karnataka. He defeated K. S. Eshwarappa, Ex-Deputy Chief Minister in the Shimoga constituency in the 2013 Karnataka Legislative Assembly election.

Early life
Prasanna Kumar was born on 17 November 1968. His father's name is Krishnamurthy and his mother's name is Bhagirati Bai. He lost his father at an early age and had to support his family.

Kumar did his schooling at Deshiya Vidyashala Shimoga. He joined Acharya Tulasi College for his B.Com. He could not study further due to financial problems.

References

External links
 https://web.archive.org/web/20130308065141/http://www.bprasannakumar.com/main.html
 http://myneta.info/karnataka2013/candidate.php?candidate_id=418

Karnataka MLAs 2008–2013
Indian National Congress politicians from Karnataka
People from Shimoga
1968 births
Living people